The 2007 Misano Superbike World Championship round was the eighth round of the 2007 Superbike World Championship. It took place on the weekend of June 15–17, 2007 at the Misano Adriatico circuit.

Superbike race 1 classification

Superbike race 2 classification

Supersport race classification

References 
 Superbike Race 1
 Superbike Race 2
 Supersport Race

Misano Round
Misano